Several Indian individuals and films have received or been nominated for the Academy Awards (also known as the Oscars) in different categories. , 20 Indians have been nominated and 10 have won Oscars including in the scientific and technical category.

At the 30th Academy Awards, Mehboob Khan's 1957 Hindi-language film Mother India was India's first submission for the Academy Award for Best International Feature Film category. It was nominated alongside four other films and lost to the Italian film Nights of Cabiria (1957) by one vote. In 1982, The National Film Development Corporation of India was instrumental in co-producing Richard Attenborough's biographical film Gandhi. At the 55th Academy Awards, Bhanu Athaiya became the first Indian to win an Academy Award for designing the costumes. Ravi Shankar was nominated for Best Original Score for the same film. As of 2023, three Indian films have been nominated for Best International Feature—Mother India, Salaam Bombay! (1988) and Lagaan (2001).

In 1992, legendary Bengali filmmaker Satyajit Ray was bestowed with an Honorary Academy Award, becoming the only Indian to date to receive the honour. Resul Pookutty and A. R. Rahman won the Academy Award for Best Sound Mixing and Best Original Score, respectively, for the 2008 British film Slumdog Millionaire. Rahman also won for Best Original Song alongside lyricist Gulzar for the song "Jai Ho", becoming the first Indian to date to have won more than one Academy Award. Rahman also holds the record for most nominations for an Indian with five total nominations to date, followed by Ismail Merchant with four nominations (three for Best Picture and once for Live Action Short). 

At the 95th Academy Awards, three different Indian productions received Oscar nominations, with both RRR and The Elephant Whisperers winning their respective categories. Several Indians and Indian Americans have received the Oscars in the technical category like Rahul Thakkar, Cottalango Leon and Vikas Sathaye.

Honorary awards

Competitive awards

Scientific and technical awards

See also 
 List of Indian submissions for the Academy Award for Best International Feature Film
 List of Indian winners and nominees of the Golden Globe Awards
 List of Indian Grammy Award winners and nominees
 List of Indian winners and nominees at the Cannes Film Festival

Footnotes

References 

Indian
Academy Awards